Terry Robert Kirkman (born December 12, 1939) is a retired American musician best known as a vocalist for the pop group the Association and the writer of several of the band's hit songs such as "Cherish", "Everything That Touches You" and "Six Man Band". As a member of the Association, he was inducted  into the Vocal Group Hall of Fame in 2003.

Early life
Kirkman was born in Salina, Kansas and was raised in Chino, California. He attended Chaffey College as a music major. As a salesman visiting Hawaii in 1962, Kirkman met Jules Alexander, who was in the Navy at the time, and the two resolved to meet when Alexander would be discharged from his military duties.

Career

Early career
Kirkman moved to Los Angeles with Alexander in 1963 and played with Frank Zappa before Zappa formed the Mothers of Invention. Kirkman and Alexander founded the folk group the Inner Tubes, which at one time included both Cass Elliott and David Crosby. The Inner Tubes slowly merged from a small group into a 13-piece band called the Men.

The Association
The Men disbanded in February 1965 and Kirkman and five other members formed their own band. To find a new name, they perused a dictionary and chose the Association after it was suggested by Kirkman's fiancée.

The Association quickly gained notoriety with their songs “Cherish” and “Along Comes Mary” from their 1966 debut album And Then... Along Comes the Association.

Kirkman contributed vocals to many songs, including "Never My Love", "Cherish" and "Everything That Touches You".

He performed with the group at the Monterey Pop Festival in 1967. His "Requiem for the Masses", a song written about the war in Vietnam, featured requiem-style vocals.

Personal life
Kirkman left the Association in 1984 and worked in California as an addictions counselor beginning in 2001.

He was present with the Association's surviving members when they were inducted into the Vocal Group Hall of Fame in 2003. Kirkman lives in Montclair, California.

Discography

Albums 
 And Then... Along Comes the Association (1966)
 Renaissance (1966)
 Insight Out (1967)
 Birthday (1968)
 The Association (1969)
 Stop Your Motor (1971)
 Waterbeds in Trinidad! (1972)

Singles

References

External links

1939 births
Living people
People from Salina, Kansas
American male singer-songwriters
American pop musicians
Singer-songwriters from Kansas
The Association members